Hyderabad, India is a major hub of Defense research and missile technology in India. The city houses many multinational and Indian premier research centers for defense technology.

Indian Premier Defence Centers
 

 Defence Research and Development Organisation (DRDO)
 Defence Research and Development Laboratory (DRDL
 Advanced Numerical Research and Analysis Group (ANURAG)
 Defence Electronics Research Laboratory (DLRL)
 Defence Metallurgical Research Laboratory (DMRL)
 Research Centre Imarat (RCI)
 Centre for Advanced Systems (CAS)

Private Partnership

 Tata Advanced Systems (TAS)
 Saab India Technology Centre (SITC)
 DuPont Ballistics Facility (DBF)
 National Balloon Facility (NBF)

References
Growth of Defence sector in Hyderabad
Foreign collaboration
Detail information about DRDO
Comprehensive Information

Defence research centers
Hyderabad
Hyderabad, defence research centers